Gent per Formentera (GxF), is a political grouping of the island of Formentera that appeared in 2007 to contest the elections to the Island Council of Formentera and the elections to the Parliament of the Balearic Islands (in coalition with PSIB). They describe themselves as a left-wing, environmentalist and nationalist party dedicated to fulfilling the specific needs of the island.

History
In the 2007 Island Council elections, GxF was the most voted party, obtaining five councilors. This result, along with a post-election pact with the two councilors of the PSIB, resulted in the GxF leader Jaume Ferrer Ribas becoming president of the newly formed Island Council of Formentera. In the 2011 election, GxF obtained six island councilors, returning the incumbent insular government to power. The group also won the regional deputy of the island of Formentera for the Parliament of the Balearic Islands. In 2015, GxF won the election in the Island Council by absolute majority and retained its sole representative in the regional Parliament.

Electoral performance

Parliament of the Balearic Islands

 * Within People for Formentera+PSOE

Island Council of Formentera

External link
 Gent per Formentera

Political parties in the Balearic Islands
Socialist parties in Spain
Formentera
Political parties established in 2007
2007 establishments in Spain